The German Republic or Republic of Germany can refer to:
 The German Reich (1919–1933), also called the Weimar Republic, the historical German state in existence from 1919 to 1933
 The German Democratic Republic (East Germany), the historical German socialist state aligned with Eastern Bloc in existence from 1949 to 1990
 The Federal Republic of Germany (West Germany), also called the Bonn Republic, the contemporary German state aligned with Western Bloc between 1949 and 1990
 The Federal Republic of Germany (reunited Germany), also called the Berlin Republic, the contemporary German state since 1990